Club Polideportivo Valdivia is a football team based in Valdivia, Villanueva de la Serena in the autonomous community of Extremadura. Founded in 1956, it plays in Tercera División – Group 14.

History 
In the 2018-19 season the club finished 13th, just 6 points away from being relegated from the Tercera División.

Season to season

9 seasons in Tercera División

References

External links
Futbolme.com profile 
fexfutbol.com profile

Football clubs in Extremadura
Association football clubs established in 1956
Divisiones Regionales de Fútbol clubs
1956 establishments in Spain
Province of Badajoz